United Nations Security Council Resolution 44, adopted on 1 April 1948, having received the reports requested in United Nations Security Council Resolution 42, the Council requested the Secretary-General convoke a special session of the General Assembly to consider further the question of the future government of Palestine.

The resolution was adopted with two abstentions from the Ukrainian SSR and the Soviet Union.

See also
 List of United Nations Security Council Resolutions 1 to 100 (1946–1953)

References
Text of the Resolution at undocs.org

External links
 

 0044
 0044
Mandatory Palestine
1948 in Mandatory Palestine
1948 in Israel
April 1948 events